Fight Night may refer to:

Film and television
 Fight Night (film), a.k.a. Rigged, a 2008 film
 "Fight Night" (CSI), an episode of CSI: Crime Scene Investigation
 Fight Night (TV programme), a British boxing programme
 "Fight Night" and "Fight Night II", episodes of Big Brother (UK) series 5 and series 9, respectively

Video games
 Fight Night (1985 video game), a boxing computer game published by Accolade and U.S. Gold
 Fight Night (video game series), a series of video games produced by EA Sports, unrelated to the Accolade game
 Fight Night 2004, the first game in the series
 Fight Night Round 2, the first sequel to Fight Night 2004
 Fight Night Round 3, the second sequel
 Fight Night Round 4, the third sequel
 Fight Night Champion, the fourth sequel

Sports
 UFC Ultimate Fight Night, a series of Ultimate Fighting Championship events
Fight Night, a boxing program on NBCSN

Other
 "Fight Night" (song), a 2014 song by Migos
 Fight Night (novel), a 2021 novel by Miriam Toews

See also
 "Fight Knight", an episode of the 2008 TV series Knight Rider''